Joe Stampley is an American country music artist. His discography consists of 20 studio albums, nine compilation albums, two live albums, 62 singles, and two music videos. All 62 of his singles charted on the Billboard Hot Country Songs chart between 1971 and 1989, including four number one hits: "Soul Song" (1972), "Roll On Big Mama" (1975), "All These Things" (1976), and "Just Good Ol' Boys" (with Moe Bandy) (1979).

Albums

Studio albums

Compilation albums

Live albums

Singles

1970s

1980s

Music videos

See also
The Uniques (Louisiana band)

References

Country music discographies
Discographies of American artists